Arthur Chichester, 3rd Earl of Donegall (1666 – 10 April 1706) was an Irish nobleman and soldier. Having succeeded his father as third Earl of Donegall in 1678, he refused to attend the Irish Parliament called by James II in May 1689, but later sat in the Parliament called by William III in October 1692.

Having made a career in the English Army, Lord Donegall founded the 35th Regiment of Foot in Belfast in 1701, becoming its first Colonel. In 1704 he accompanied the regiment to fight in the War of the Spanish Succession in Spain, and was appointed major general of Spanish forces. He was killed in action in 1706 at the fort of Montjuich near Barcelona, and was buried in that city.

He had married Lady Catherine Forbes, daughter of Arthur Forbes, 1st Earl of Granard.

References

1666 births
1706 deaths
English generals
English military personnel killed in action
35th Regiment of Foot officers
Arthur
3
Mayors of Belfast